6159 Andréseloy is a Vesta asteroid from the inner regions of the asteroid belt, approximately  in diameter. It was discovered on 30 December 1991, by Japanese astronomers Seiji Ueda and Hiroshi Kaneda at Kushiro Observatory on the island of Hokkaido, Japan. It was named after Mexican astronomer Andrés Eloy Martínez.

Orbit and classification 

Andréseloy is an attributed member of the Vesta family, one of the largest collisional populations of stony asteroids in the asteroid belt. It orbits the Sun in the inner main-belt at a distance of 2.1–2.4 AU (semi-major axis of 2.29 AU) once every 3 years and 6 months (1,267 days). Its orbit has an eccentricity of 0.06 and an inclination of 7° with respect to the ecliptic.

Naming 

This minor planet was named in honor of Andrés Eloy Martínez, Mexican astronomer and citizen scientist. He is known in his country for the adaptation of the novel The War of the Worlds. He likes to create scientific videos for the Internet. His main concerns are global warming and the impact of an asteroid on Earth.

Contest 

The name was suggested by the Urania Astronomical Society of Mexico. This society was a winner of the NameExoWorlds contest organised by International Astronomical Union (IAU) in 2015, and was also awarded the naming right for this asteroid. In total, the naming of 17 minor planets such as 6117 Brevardastro was granted as an award to the contest's winners. The  was approved by the IAU's Committee on Small Body Nomenclature and published by the Minor Planet Center on 12 February 2017.

Physical characteristics 

Andréseloy has been characterized as a common S-type asteroid.

Rotation and poles 

In March 2006, a rotational lightcurve of Andréseloy was obtained from photometric observations by American astronomer Brian Warner at this Palmer Divide Observatory, Colorado. Lightcurve analysis gave an average rotation period of 10.639 hours with a brightness variation of 0.78 magnitude. Such a high brightness amplitude typically indicates that the body has a non-spheroidal shape.

Poles 

In 2013, an international study modeled a lightcurve with a concurring period of 10.6590 hours and found a spin axis of (266.0°, 67.0°) and (62.0°, 67.0°) in ecliptic coordinates (λ, β).

Diameter and albedo 

According to the survey carried out by NASA's Wide-field Infrared Survey Explorer with its subsequent NEOWISE mission, Andréseloy measures 5.263 kilometers in diameter and its surface has a high albedo of 0.484. The Collaborative Asteroid Lightcurve Link assumes an albedo of 0.24 – derived from 8 Flora, the largest member and namesake of its family – and calculates a diameter of 5.41 kilometers with an absolute magnitude of 13.5.

References

External links 
 
 Lightcurve Database Query (LCDB), at www.minorplanet.info
 Dictionary of Minor Planet Names, Google books
 Asteroids and comets rotation curves, CdR – Geneva Observatory, Raoul Behrend
 Discovery Circumstances: Numbered Minor Planets (5001)-(10000) – Minor Planet Center
 
 
 

006159
Discoveries by Hiroshi Kaneda
Discoveries by Seiji Ueda
Named minor planets
19911230